{{DISPLAYTITLE:C12H11I3N2O4}}
The molecular formula C12H11I3N2O4 (molar mass: 627.940 g/mol) may refer to:

 Iodamide
 Metrizoic acid

Molecular formulas